Massive Luxury Overdose is the second studio album by the Swedish pop group Army of Lovers. The album was released in 1991, and the second version (called U.S. Edition) was released in 1992. The album contains the band's biggest hits, including "Obsession", and "Crucified", which was a #1 hit in 29 countries. The original version of this album also includes three songs from their first album Disco Extravaganza (1990), which aren't included in the U.S. edition."

Background
When La Camilla left the band in 1991, she was replaced by Michaela Dornonville de la Cour. For the second release in 1992, the band recorded four new songs and released the album under the same name but with a new cover, introducing Michaela.

Army of Lovers made their first tour in March 1992 and at that time the album had already sold over 500,000 copies. The tour began in Sweden, at High Chaparral in Kulltorp, and after several Swedish cities the tour continued throughout Europe.

Critical reception
AllMusic editor Neil Raggett wrote, "Some album titles do nail it, and this is one of the prime candidates." "Crucified" was named the "most memorable number", "a totally over-the-top disco anthem on all fronts". He also mentioned the "half-twinky, half-ominous" "Candyman Messiah" and "Say Goodbye to Babylon", which are "taking religious imagery and tweaking it for all it's worth". David A. Keeps from Austin American Statesman felt the album is "audacious in its appropriations". He added; "We Stand United" is "a rote re-creation of Chic's classic disco", "Say Goodbye to Babylon" "blends Theme from Midnight Express into massive hallelujah choruses suitable for Andrew Lloyd Webber", "I Cross the Rubicon" has "a piano bass line [that] thunders beneath cymbals, horn crescendos, whispered male vocals and soul diva whoops", "Walking With a Zombie" "fuses boulevardier accordion with an insistent Latin beat", and "Crucified" is "steeped in romantic and biblical imagery that suggests, in a typically broad camp stroke, that obsessive love is the most religious experience of all." 

American magazine Billboard constated that the "campy Swedish trio continues to reverently pilfer through '70s-era disco and '80s-style hi-NRG on this glittery sophomore outing." They highlighted the "bombastic" "Dynasty of Planet Chromada" and the "swin-vibed" "Say Goodbye to Babylon", and concluded, "Melodramatic dance/pop that should make acts like Pet Shop Boys green with envy." NME said, "A great record, proper disco style dance music and packed full of cultural surprises." Joe Brown from The Washington Post wrote that here, "the Army presents its unapologetic, exuberant Eurodisco as if house never happened." He felt that on tracks like "Crucified" and "Dynasty of Planet Chromada", "the Army reveals a lyrical obsession with a millenarian-apocalyptic- sacrilege thang, and La Camilla's kitschy cooing includes imitations of Grace Jones and Debbie Harry."

Commercial performance
In Sweden, Massive Luxury Overdose sold about 70,000 copies, and worldwide the album sold at least 2 million copies.

Track listing

Charts

Sales and certifications

Personnel
Backing vocals: Erika Essen-Möller, Jean-Paul Wall, Katarina Wilczewski, Malin Bäckström, Richard Evenlind
Co-producer: Per Adebratt (tracks: 1 to 6, 8 to 10)
Engineer: Per Adebratt (tracks: 1 to 10)
Guitar: Anders Wollbeck (tracks: 1, 5, 7, 10)
Keyboards: Anders Wollbeck (tracks: 1 to 10)
Mixed by: Per Adebratt (tracks: 1 to 10)
Percussion: André Ferrari (tracks: 1, 4, 5, 10)
Producer: Alexander Bard (tracks: 1 to 10), Anders Wollbeck (tracks: 1 to 10)
Programmed by: Anders Wollbeck (tracks: 1 to 10)
Saxophone: Anders Gustavson (tracks: 1, 5, 8, 10)

Notes

References

1991 albums
1992 albums
Army of Lovers albums
Stockholm Records albums